Châteaumeillant is a commune in the Cher department in the Centre-Val de Loire region of France.

Geography

Population

Sights
 The abbey church of St. Genès, dating from the twelfth century.
 A medieval castle.
 Other buildings, originally part of the abbey.
 The museum, dating from the fourteenth century.
 The eleventh-century church of Notre-Dame.

See also
Communes of the Cher department

References

External links

Official town website 
Website of the winegrowing cooperative 

Communes of Cher (department)
Bituriges Cubi